Anand is a name of Indian origin, derived from the Sanskrit abstract noun आनन्द (ānanda), which means happiness or joy.

People with the surname Anand

Engineers and scientists
B. K. Anand (1917–2007), Indian physiologist and pharmacologist
Nitya Anand (born 1925), Indian scientist

Sports
 Amrik Anand (born 1947), Indian cricketer
 Chetan Anand (badminton) (born 1980), Indian badminton player
 Subramanian Anand (born 1986), Sri Lankan cricketer
 Jagrit Anand (born 1989), Indian cricketer

Entertainment
 A. V. Anand (born 1936), Indian musician
 Akshay Anand, Indian actor
 Ambika Anand (born 1980), Indian television anchor and editor
 Anand Raj Anand, Indian music director, composer, lyricist and playback singer
 Anita Anand (born 1972), British radio and television presenter and journalist
 Chetan Anand (director) (1921–1997), Indian producer, screenwriter, and director; member of the Anand family
 Dev Anand (1923–2011), Indian actor, writer, director, and producer; member of the Anand family
 Inder Raj Anand (died 1987), Indian film writer
 K. V. Anand (1966–2021), Indian cinematographer, film director and photo journalist
 Mayank Anand (born 1979), Indian actor, artist, author and director
 Mukul S. Anand (1951–1997), Indian film director and producer
 Nikita Anand (born 1983), Indian model, actress and beauty queen
 Priya Anand (born 1986), Indian film actress and model
 Shakti Anand (born 1975), Indian television actor
 Shilpa Anand (born 1982), Indian model, television and movie actress
 Shoma Anand (born 1958), Indian television and film actress
 Siddharth Anand, Indian film director
 Suneil Anand (born 1956), Indian film actor
 Suparna Anand (born 1969), Indian film actress
 Tinnu Anand, Indian actor and director
 Veebha Anand (born 1991), Indian television actress
 Vijay Anand (filmmaker) (1925–2004), Indian filmmaker, producer, screenwriter, editor, and actor; member of the Anand family

Politics 

 Anita Anand (born 1967), Canadian lawyer and current Member of Parliament currently serving as Minister of Public Services and Procurement
 Deepak Anand (born 1972), Canadian politician, MPP from Ontario
 Harvinder "Harry" Anand, Indian-American politician
 Vijay Anand (politician) (born 1969), Indian politician

Others
 Anjum Anand (born 1971), British Indian food writer and TV chef
 Adarsh Sein Anand (1936 - 2017), Indian Chief Justice of the Supreme Court
 Anurag Anand (born 1978), Indian author
 Gaggan Anand, Indian chef
 Geeta Anand, Indian journalist
 Harjit Singh Anand (born 1948), Indian government administrator
 Javed Anand (born ), Indian journalist and civil rights activist
 Margot Anand (born 1944), French author, teacher, seminar leader and public speaker
 Mulk Raj Anand (1905–2004), Indian writer
 Ruchi Anand, Indian international professor
 Satyapal Anand (born 1931), Indian poet, critic and writer
 Valerie Anand (born 1937), pen name of Fiona Buckley, British author

People with the given name Anand

Academics 
 Anand Kumar (born 1973), Indian mathematician
 Anand Menon, United Kingdom professor
 Anand Mohan (born 1957), Indian academic
 Anand Rai (born 1977), Indian activist, medical officer and ophthalmologist
 Anand Reddi, American researcher and global health specialist

Business 
 Anand Burman (born 1950s), Indian businessman
 Anand Jain (born 1957), Indian businessman
 Anand Mahindra (born 1955), Indian businessman 
 Anand Rajaraman, Indian-American web and technology entrepreneur
 Anand Lal Shimpi (born 1982), American businessman

Entertainment 
 Anand (actor), Indian film actor
 Anand Raj Anand, Indian music director, composer, lyricist and playback singer
 Anand Babu, Indian film actor
 Anand Bhate (born 1971), Indian classical vocalist
 Anand Chitragupth, Indian music director
 Anand Gandhi (born 1980), Indian filmmaker and screenwriter
 Anand Goradia (born 1975), Indian television actor and writer
 Anand Jeeva, Indian cinematographer
 Anand Madhusoodanan (born 1988), Indian film score composer
 Anand Modak (1951–2014), Indian film composer and music director 
 Anand Narayan (born 1985), Indian television personality and playback singer
 Anand L Rai (born 1971), Indian film director and producer
 Anand Ranga (born 1975), Indian film director
 Anand Sai, Indian film art director
 Anand Shetty, Kannada rapper
 Anand Sivakumaran, Indian writer and director
 Anand Suryavanshi (born 1957), Indian television actor
 Anand Tucker (born 1963), English film director and producer

Politics 
 Anand (Maoist) or Katakam Sudarshan, Indian cadre
 Anand Ahirwar (born 1964), Indian politician
 Anand Babla (1954–2008), Fijian politician of Indian descent
 Anand Dev Bhatt, Nepalese writer and politician
 Anand Dighe (died 2001), Indian politician
 Anand Narain Mulla (1901–1997), Indian poet and politician
 Anand Bhushan Pandey, Indian politician
 Anand Panyarachun (born 1932), Thai Prime Minister
 Anand Paranjpe (born 1973), Indian industrialist and politician
 Anand Ramlogan (born 1972), Trinidadian Attorney General
 Anand Satyanand (born 1944), New Zealand Governor-General
 Anand Sharma (born 1953), Indian politician
 Anand Singh (Fijian politician) (born 1948), Indian-Fijian lawyer and politician
 Anand Mohan Singh, Indian politician
 Anand Sen Yadav, Indian politician

Sports 
 Anand Amritraj (born 1951), Indian tennis player and businessman
 Anand Bais (born 1991), Indian cricketer
 Anand Bhatia (born 1947), Indian cricketer
 Anand Deshpande (born 1970), Indian cricketer
 Anand Katti (born 1972), Indian cricketer 
 Anand Rajan (born 1987), Indian cricketer
 Anand Tummala (born 1978), Indian American cricketer

Other 
 Anand (writer) or P. Satchidanandan (born 1936), Indian writer
 Anand Bakshi (1920–2002), Indian poet and lyricist
 Anand Giridharadas (born 1981), American writer and newspaper columnist
 Anand Gopal, American journalist
 Anand Grover, Indian lawyer
 Anand Jon (born 1976), Indian-American fashion designer
 Anand Rishiji Maharaj (1900–1992), Indian pattadhar acharya of Jains
 Anand Mahadevan (born 1979), Indian-Canadian writer
 Anand Naidoo, South African-American news anchor and correspondent
 Anand Neelakantan (born 1973), Indian author
 Anand Patwardhan (born 1950), Indian documentary filmmaker
 Anand Swarup (died 1937), guru
 Anand Viswanathan (born 1969), Indian chess grandmaster
 Anand Yadav (1935–2016), Indian writer

References

Indian masculine given names